The Cedros Island horned lizard (Phrynosoma cerroense) is a horned lizard species native to Cedros Island in Mexico.

References

Phrynosoma
Reptiles of Mexico
Reptiles described in 1893
Taxa named by Leonhard Stejneger